Lepidochrysops loewensteini, the Loewenstein's blue, is a species of butterfly in the family Lycaenidae. It is endemic to South Africa and Lesotho. It is mainly found in Lesotho and on the high slopes above Dulcie's Nek in the Eastern Cape.

The wingspan is 32–35 mm for males and 32–33 mm for females. Adults are on wing from January to February. Their life cycle produces one generation per year.

References

Lepidochrysops
Insects of South Africa
Butterflies described in 1951
Butterflies of Africa
Taxonomy articles created by Polbot